Scharliina Eräpuro (born October 18, 1999), known artistically as Scharliina, is a Finnish-Swedish singer-songwriter, actress, and model. She is a member of the Swedish pop duo Lightworkers. Eräpuro is best known for her roles in UK TV series Corner Shop and Swedish Discovery+ series Skitsamma.

The singer headlined Miss Supranational Finland 2021.

Filmography

Discography

Singles

As featured artist 

 "For You" (Latencies ft Scharliina)

References 

Swedish women singer-songwriters
Swedish female models
1999 births
Living people
Swedish actresses
Finnish actresses
Finnish women singer-songwriters
Finnish female models